George R. Samolenko (born December 20, 1930), later known as George Samsen, is a Canadian former ice hockey player who competed and won a silver medal in the 1960 Winter Olympics. He was born in Oshawa, Ontario.

Hockey career 
From 1947 to 1949, Samolenko played with the Winnipeg Monarchs of the Manitoba Junior Hockey League. Afterward, he moved to the Ontario Junior Hockey League where he played two seasons with the Oshawa Generals. After a while of searching, he decided to play with the Eastern Ontario Hockey League, spending his first season with the Kingston Goodyears. In 1956, Samolenko joined the Whitby Dunlops, which is when his career took off. He received an Allan Cup, which got his team in a position to play in the 1958 World Ice Hockey Championships. The Dunlops brought home a gold medal from the tournament. They won a second Allan Cup in 1959, which gave them the ability to compete in the 1960 Winter Olympics, but they turned down the opportunity. That opportunity was then given to the Kitchener-Waterloo Dutchmen, who decided to take Samolenko along with them. At the Olympics, Samolenko won a silver medal. After the victory, he decided to retire for good.

External links

Citations 

1930 births
Living people
Canadian ice hockey players
Ice hockey people from Ontario
Ice hockey players at the 1960 Winter Olympics
Medalists at the 1960 Winter Olympics
Olympic ice hockey players of Canada
Olympic medalists in ice hockey
Olympic silver medalists for Canada
Sportspeople from Oshawa